Indutech (Industrial textiles) is the branch of technical textile that deals with textiles used in the diverse industrial applications such as in filtration, conveying, cleaning and other industrial uses.

Industrial textiles 
These are the specially designed (unconventional) textiles useful in the industrial processes, products and services.  Technical textiles are classified with their area of applications, and it is divided into twelve separate categories. Though certain sectors overlap each other. Industrial textiles can act as an component to strengthen other product, or act as a tool similar to filteration, or it can be a product (independaently) sufficing several functions. Indutech has vast application areas like filtration, cleaning, chemical industry, electrical applications and in mechanical engineering. Indutech includes conveyor belts, drive belts, ropes and cordages, filtration products, glass battery separators, decatising and bolting cloth, AGM (absorption glass mat)  plasma screens, coated abrasives, composite materials, printed circuit boards, printer ribbon, seals, gaskets, paper making fabrics.

Ratio 
Indutech is a large economic activity. As per records referring reports of 2009-10, in India, Composite materials 37% and ropes and cordages around 27% were the major contributors in the total share of Indutech.

Material 
Several synthetic and high-performance fibers are used to achieve the appropriate performance from the components.

See also 

 Automotive textile, textiles used in a variety of applications in the automotive industry.
 Clothtech, technical textiles for clothing and footwear applications.
Membrane technology
Microfiltration
 Performance (textiles) the ability of textiles to withstand against various conditions and environments.
Semipermeable membrane

References 

Textiles